Schmidt House may refer to:

in the United States
(by state)
George Schmidt House, Denver, Colorado, listed on the NRHP in Colorado
Schmidt-Godert Farm, Panama City, Florida, NRHP-listed
The Propylaeum (John W. Schmidt House), Indianapolis, Indiana, NRHP-listed
Louis C. and Amelia L. Schmidt House, Davenport, Iowa, NRHP-listed
Schmidt Block, Davenport, Iowa, NRHP-listed
F. Jacob Schmidt House, Davenport, Iowa, NRHP-listed
Westphal-Schmidt House, Davenport, Iowa, NRHP-listed
Schmidt House (Elkader, Iowa), NRHP-listed
Mueller-Schmidt House, Dodge City, Kansas, listed on the NRHP in Kansas
Carl E. and Alice Candler Schmidt House, Grosse Pointe Farms, Michigan, NRHP-listed
Clara and Julius Schmidt House, Wabasha, Minnesota, NRHP-listed
Schmidt House (Florissant, Missouri), listed on the NRHP in Missouri
Charles J. and Clara B. Schmidt House, Jefferson City, Missouri, NRHP-listed
Albert Schmidt House and Studio, Tesuque, New Mexico, listed on the NRHP in New Mexico
Millen-Schmidt House, Xenia, Ohio, NRHP-listed
Claus and Hannchen Schmidt House, Grants Pass, Oregon, listed on the NRHP in Oregon
Poth and Schmidt Development Houses, Philadelphia, Pennsylvania, NRHP-listed
Schmidt House (Brenhamm, Texas), listed on the NRHP in Texas
F. W. Schmidt House, Olympia, Washington, listed on the NRHP in Washington
Christian Schmidt House, Waterville, Washington, listed on the NRHP in Washington